Flora is the name of two unrelated varieties of grape, one white and one red, both of United States origin.

White Flora 

The white Flora is a California wine grape. It is a crossing of Semillon and Gewürztraminer, both Vitis vinifera varieties, and it was created in 1938 by Harold P. Olmo at the California Agricultural Experiment Station.

Red Flora 

The red Flora is an interspecific hybrid between V. vinifera and Vitis labrusca, and it was created in 1850 by A. M. Spangler.

See also
Olmo grapes

References

Red wine grape varieties
White wine grape varieties
Hybrid grape varieties